Korenshchina is a rural locality (a khutor) in Sergeyevskoye Rural Settlement, Podgorensky District, Voronezh Oblast, Russia. The population was 93 as of 2010.

Geography 
Korenshchina is located 11 km southeast of Podgorensky (the district's administrative centre) by road. Kuleshovka is the nearest rural locality.

References 

Rural localities in Podgorensky District